Liberty Township is a township in Kingman County, Kansas, USA.  As of the 2000 census, its population was 178.

Geography
Liberty Township covers an area of 36.31 square miles (94.03 square kilometers); of this, 0.02 square miles (0.05 square kilometers) or 0.05 percent is water. The stream of Skunk Creek runs through this township.

Cities and towns
 Nashville

Adjacent townships
 Kingman Township (north)
 Peters Township (northeast)
 Rochester Township (east)
 Ridge Township, Barber County (south)
 Medicine Lodge Township, Barber County (southwest)
 Township No. 11 Township, Pratt County (west)
 Valley Township, Barber County (west)

Cemeteries
The township contains two cemeteries: Nashville and Saint John.

Major highways
 K-42 (Kansas highway)

References
 U.S. Board on Geographic Names (GNIS)
 United States Census Bureau cartographic boundary files

External links
 US-Counties.com
 City-Data.com

Townships in Kingman County, Kansas
Townships in Kansas